Lewis Edward Lawes (September 13, 1883 – April 23, 1947) was a prison warden and a proponent of prison reform. During his 21-year tenure at Sing Sing Correctional Facility, he supervised the executions of 303 prisoners.

Biography
Lawes was born on September 13, 1883 in Elmira, New York. He was the only child of Henry Lewis Lawes (died 1925) and Sarah Abbott. His father worked as a prison guard at the New York State Reformatory, now called the Elmira Correctional Facility.

Lawes ran away at 17 and joined the United States Coast Artillery. Afterwards, he worked at an insurance company before beginning his prison career as a guard at Clinton Prison in Dannemora, New York on March 1, 1905. On September 30, 1905, he married Katherine Stanley. He subsequently worked at first Auburn Prison, then Elmira Reformatory. In March 1915 he was named Superintendent of the City Reformatory on Hart Island in New York City. Lawes became warden of the Massachusetts State Prison in 1918. New York Governor Al Smith asked him to take over as Warden of Sing Sing. Lawes took charge on January 1, 1920.

He was featured on the cover and in an article of Time magazine issue of November 18, 1929.

His wife, Kathryn (1887-1937), died on October 31, 1937 at Ossining Hospital after she fell at the Cortlandt, New York end of the Bear Mountain Bridge. The heel of her shoe was caught between two boards and it caused her to fall and break her leg. She wasn't found until nighttime and she died from hypothermia.

He remained at his post as Warden of Sing Sing for twenty-one years, instituting reforms, until he retired on July 16, 1941.  He was replaced by Robert J. Kirby.

Lawes became the president of the Boy Rangers of America in 1941.

Lawes died of a cerebral hemorrhage on April 23, 1947 at age 63 in Garrison, New York. He was interred at Sleepy Hollow Cemetery in Sleepy Hollow, New York.

Writings
Lawes wrote several books. Several of his works were made into films. His most famous book, Twenty Thousand Years in Sing Sing, was made into a 1932 movie under the same title, starring Spencer Tracy, and again in 1940 as Castle on the Hudson, featuring John Garfield. Over the Wall was produced in 1938 based on the life of one of his inmates, Alabama Pitts. Invisible Stripes in 1939, with George Raft, was based on his novel of the same name, while Humphrey Bogart starred in You Can't Get Away with Murder in 1939, an adaptation of Chalked Out, a play Lawes co-wrote.

His papers are archived in the Special Collections of the Lloyd Sealy Library, John Jay College of Criminal Justice.

References

External links
 
 Lewis E. Lawes Papers (1883–1947) (finding aid); collection housed in Lloyd Sealy Library Special Collections, John Jay College of Criminal Justice
 Photographs from the Lewis E. Lawes Papers (digitized) in the Lloyd Sealy Library Digital Collections

1883 births
1947 deaths
American prison officers
Penal system in New York (state)
Penologists
Wardens of Sing Sing
Burials at Sleepy Hollow Cemetery
People from Elmira, New York
People from Ossining, New York
People from Garrison, New York
Elmira Correctional Facility
20th-century American male writers